Lloyd David Newell (born 1956) is an American journalist, announcer and author, who is the current voice of Music and the Spoken Word (the oldest continuous nationwide network radio broadcast in America), He is also a professor of religion and family life at Brigham Young University (BYU).  He was previously an anchor for CNN and WSEE-TV. He is a descendant of Susannah Stone Lloyd, a member of the Willie Handcart company.

Newell received a Ph.D. in Family Sciences from BYU in 1999.

He and his wife, Karmel, are the parents of four children.

Newell has written numerous books, including May Peace Be With You, The Divine Connection, Come Listen to a Prophet's Voice,  The Healer's Art.

In 1990, Newell was appointed host of Music and the Spoken Word by Gordon B. Hinckley, who was then a counselor in the First Presidency of the Church of Jesus Christ of Latter-day Saints.  Since May 2021, Newell has been serving as a counselor in a stake presidency.

References

External links

Biography at the official Music and the Spoken Word site

1956 births
American Latter Day Saints
Brigham Young University alumni
Brigham Young University faculty
Living people